HHA may refer to:

 HHA Services, an American service company
 Haji Husein Alireza & Co. Ltd., a Saudi Arabian trading company
 Hallische Händel-Ausgabe, a collection of the works of George Frideric Handel
 Hamburger Hochbahn, a transit operator in Hamburg, Germany
 Hans Henrik Andreasen, Danish footballer and manager with the nickname HHA
 Herbert Henry Asquith, former Prime Minister of the United Kingdom
 Historic Hotels of America, an American hotel affiliation group
 Historic Houses Association, a British organisation that represents privately owned historic properties
 Houston Housing Authority, the operator of public housing in Houston, Texas